Fort Pierce is a city in and the county seat of St. Lucie County, Florida, United States. The city is part of the Treasure Coast region of Atlantic Coast Florida. It is also known as the Sunrise City, sister to San Francisco, California, the Sunset City. Per the 2020 census, the population was 47,297.

History
It was named after the Fort Pierce Army post which was built nearby in 1838 during the Second Seminole War.  The military post had been named for Benjamin Kendrick Pierce, a career United States Army officer and the brother of President Franklin Pierce. It was the largest city on Florida's Atlantic Coast between Daytona Beach and West Palm Beach until 1970 when it was surpassed by Melbourne.

Geography
According to the U. S. Census Bureau, the city has a total area of 20.8 mi2 (53.8 km2), of which 14.7 square miles (38.2 km2) is land and 6.0 square miles (15.6 km2) of it (35.00%) is water.

Environment

Shore Protection project
According to the U.S. Army Corps of Engineers, The Fort Pierce Beach Shore Protection project includes 1.3 miles of shore line running from immediately south of the Fort Pierce Inlet southward to Surfside Park. The project is on a two-year renourishment cycle due to impacts to the beach from the federal navigation project at Fort Pierce Inlet. This two-year renourishment cycle is a much shorter renourishment interval than what is typical for other projects along the east coast of Florida.

The initial construction of the project occurred in 1971 and the ninth nourishment was completed in May 2013. Completion of plans and specifications, advertisement and award for the 10th renourishment contract were completed in FY 2014. The project was scheduled to start mid-February 2015. Sand for the project is dredged from an approved offshore borrow area known as the Capron Shoal and then pumped via a pipeline onto the 1.3 miles of beach south of the Fort Pierce Inlet. The sponsor, St. Lucie County, is preparing a General Reevaluation Report (GRR) for the project at their own expense that will evaluate extending Federal participation for an additional 50 years. Current Federal participation expires in 2020.

The U.S. Army Corps of Engineers estimates the total cost of the project to be $75.9 million, with an estimated U.S. Federal Government share of  $46.4 million.  No funding for the project was requested by the U.S. President from the U.S. Congress in Fiscal Year 2016.

Ecology
The Experimental Oculina Research Reserve preserves the Oculina Banks, a reef of ivory bush coral (Oculina varicosa) off the coast of Fort Pierce, Florida. In 1984, a 92 square-nautical-mile (316 km2) portion of these reefs was designated the "Oculina Habitat Area of Particular Concern". In 1994, the area was closed to all manner of bottom fishing and was redesignated as a research reserve. In 2000, the marine protected area was expanded to 300 square nautical miles (1,030 km2) and prohibited all gears that caused mechanical disruption to the habitat. The city is also known for its large manatee population.

Marina

Due to the devastation caused at the Fort Pierce City Marina by hurricanes Frances and Jeanne in 2004, FEMA mandated a plan to ensure that the rebuilt facility would be protected from future such events before FEMA would release funding for the repairs. Starting in 2012, construction began to create 12 artificial barrier islands including oyster beds, lime rock artificial reefs, mangrove fringes and coastal dune. The "core" of the islands was constructed of TITANTubes, sometimes referred to as geotextile tubes or geotubes, manufactured by Flint Industries and covered by a coastal marine mattress and then armor stone. The project was completed in 2013 after six years of planning, permitting and construction and a cost of $18 million.

Climate
Fort Pierce has a humid subtropical climate, with hot, humid summers and warm, drier winters.

Demographics

2020 census

Note: the US Census treats Hispanic/Latino as an ethnic category. This table excludes Latinos from the racial categories and assigns them to a separate category. Hispanics/Latinos can be of any race.

2010 Census
As of the census of 2010, there were 41,910 people, 15,170 households, and 9,418 families residing in the city. The racial makeup of the city was 40.9% African American, 45.3% White, 0.6% Native American, 0.9% Asian, 0.1% Pacific Islander, and 2.7% from two or more races. Hispanic or Latino were 21.6% of the population.

There were 15,170 households, out of which 32.9% had children under the age of 18 living with them, 37.3% were married couples living together, 19.6% had a female householder with no husband present, and 37.9% were non-families. 32.5% of all households were made up of individuals, and 11.7% had someone living alone who was 65 years of age or older. The average household size was 2.73 and the average family size was 3.50.

In the city, the population was spread out, with 25.9% under the age of 18, 7.0% from 20 to 24, 13.3% from 25 to 34, 13.0% from 45 to 54, 9.8% from 55 to 64 and 6.8% who were 65 years of age or older. The median age was 35.2 years. For every 100 females, there were 97.4 males. For every 100 females age 18 and over, there were 94.9 males.

The median income for a household in the city was $30,869, and the median income for a family was $36,337. Males had a median income of $32,412 versus $26,349 for females. The per capita income for the city was $16,782. 30.2% of the population were below the poverty line.

Economy

Port of Fort Pierce
According to the U.S. Army Corps of Engineers, an average of 350,000 tons of waterborne commerce moves through the Port of Fort Pierce annually.  Major commodities which are dependent on the port include citrus exports, cement and aragonite imports.  The last navigation improvements at Fort Pierce were authorized by the U.S. Congress in the Water Resources Development Act of 1988 dated November 17, 1988 and construction was completed in August 1996. The existing entrance channel is 400 feet wide and 30 feet deep, the interior channel is 250 feet wide and 28 feet deep, the existing turning basin is 1,100 feet square and 28 feet deep, and the north access channel is located immediately north of the main turning basin is 1,250 feet long, 250 feet wide and 28 feet deep.

In late 2014 dredging efforts were completed in the port.  The dredging effort included both beach placement of beach quality sand on the beach immediately south of the Inlet as well as placement of non beach quality sand in the approved offshore disposal area.

Arts and culture

Tourist attractions

 A.E. Backus Museum and Gallery
 Arcade Building
 Art Mundo at the Art Bank 
 Boston House
 Dust Tracks of Zora Neale Hurston
 Harbor Branch Oceanographic Institute
 Heathcote Botanical Gardens
 Historic Main Street
 Florida Power and Light Energy Encounter
 Lincoln Park Main Street
 Old Fort Pierce City Hall
 Old Fort Park
 Manatee Center
 Navy UDT-SEAL Museum (Fort Pierce was the original home of the United States Navy SEALs)
 Smithsonian Marine Ecosystem Exhibit
 St. Lucie County Marine Center
 St. Lucie County Regional History Center
 Sunrise Theatre
Havert L. Fenn Center

Government

The city of Fort Pierce has a council–manager government form of local government. The offices of commissioner and mayor are nonpartisan, and have a term of four years.

Education

Colleges and Universities
Florida Atlantic University Harbor Branch Oceanographic Institute
Florida State University Medical School Regional Campus
Indian River State College
University of Florida Indian River Research and Education Center

High Schools
Faith Baptist School
Fort Pierce Central High School
Fort Pierce Westwood Academy
John Carroll Catholic High School
Lincoln Park Academy

Middle Schools
Dan McCarty Middle School
Forest Grove Middle School
Fort Pierce Magnet School of the Arts
Lincoln Park Academy
Saint Anastasia Middle School
Saint Andrew's Academy
Samuel S. Gaines Academy K-8

Elementary Schools
Chester A. Moore Elementary School
Fairlawn Elementary School
Fort Pierce Magnet School of the Arts
Francis K. Sweet Elementary School
Lakewood Park Elementary School
Lawnwood Elementary School
Samuel S. Gaines Academy K-8
Weatherbee Elementary School
White City Elementary School

Infrastructure

Transportation
Fort Pierce is located on U.S. Route 1, near its intersection with Florida State Road 70. Interstate 95 and Florida's Turnpike are nearby, at the west edge of town. The Intracoastal Waterway passes through the city. The nearest airport with scheduled passenger service is in Melbourne; the closest major airport is in West Palm Beach. The city itself has a general aviation airport, Treasure Coast International Airport.

Fort Pierce is served by the St. Lucie Transportation Planning Organization (TPO). The TPO is a Metropolitan Planning Organization (MPO), a federally mandated and federally funded transportation policy-making organization responsible for transportation planning, programming, and financing of State and Federal transportation funds for the City of Fort Pierce. The TPO is governed by a TPO Board, which is composed of elected officials, representatives from the St. Lucie County School Board, and representatives from Community Transit, a division of The Council on Aging of St. Lucie, Inc. The original bus system started as a demand response service bus in the 1990s; it only served St. Lucie County. Soon it expanded to a fixed route system, going to predetermined locations along a route. On June 3, 2002, the Florida Department of Transportation (FDOT) approved funding, expanding the bus service to Martin County, and it became the Treasure Coast Connector.

From 1894 to 1968 the Florida East Coast Railway served the city as a passenger railroad. Until a strike beginning in 1963, several long distance passenger trains from Chicago, Cincinnati and New York City made stops there, en route to Miami. These long distances trains included the Illinois Central Railroad's City of Miami and the Louisville & Nashville Railroad's South Wind both heading from Chicago; and they included the Atlantic Coast Line Railroad's East Coast Champion, the Havana Special, and the winter-only Florida Special originating from New York. Into the latter 1950s, passengers could take the Dixie Flagler to Chicago via Atlanta from the station. The FEC continued a six day a week Jacksonville-Miami train from 1965 to 1968, per court order.

Amtrak and the Florida East Coast Railway have been planning to make stations along Florida's East Coast. The latter operations would be part of the second phase of the private Brightline inter-city rail project. The cities cited by Amtrak and the Florida Department of Transportation include: Stuart, Fort Pierce, Vero Beach, Melbourne, Titusville, Cocoa, Daytona Beach and St. Augustine, Florida. In 2018, Brightline announced that it was looking at downtown properties for a site for a new station for the train between Fort Pierce and Miami. Ultimately, the northwestern terminus would be Orlando, with service beginning in 2021.

Notable people

Actors
Ricou Browning, director, actor, producer, screenwriter, underwater cinematographer and stuntman best known for portraying Gill-Man underwater in Universal's Creature from the Black Lagoon (1954) and its two sequels Revenge of the Creature (1955), and The Creature Walks Among Us (1956)
Michael P. Nash, Filmmaker
Lisa Janti, actress, The Lone Ranger and the City of Gold; Pearl of the South Pacific.

Businesspeople
Edwin Binney, co-founder of Crayola Crayons

Writers and artists 
A.E. "Beanie" Backus, artist and painter
Zora Neale Hurston, author best known for the novel Their Eyes Were Watching God

Musicians
Ted Hewitt, country music producer- produces Country Music artist Rodney Atkins
Gary Stewart, country singer

Politicians
Mark Foley, former U.S. Congressman
Daniel T. McCarty, 31st Governor of Florida
Allen R. Sturtevant, Associate Justice of the Vermont Supreme Court

Activists
Roslyn M. Brock, Chairman of the National Association for the Advancement of Colored People

Sports
Jeff Blackshear, NFL guard for the Seattle Seahawks, Baltimore Ravens, Kansas City Chiefs and Green Bay Packers
Jamar Chaney, NFL linebacker
Yamon Figurs, NFL and CFL wide receiver
Charles Johnson, Former MLB catcher for the Florida Marlins, Los Angeles Dodgers, Baltimore Orioles, Chicago White Sox, Colorado Rockies and Tampa Bay Rays
Ladislav Karabin, retired Czechoslovakian hockey player, who played for the Pittsburgh Penguins
Khalil Mack, NFL linebacker for the Los Angeles Chargers
Terry McGriff, MLB catcher for the Cincinnati Reds, Houston Astros, Florida Marlins and St. Louis Cardinals
Ryan McNeil, NFL defensive back
Wonder Monds, NFL defensive back
Luther Robinson, NFL defensive end
Larry Sanders, Former NBA player for the Milwaukee Bucks and Cleveland Cavaliers
Jeff Schwarz, Former MLB pitcher for the Chicago White Sox and California Angels
Herbert Strong, professional golfer and golf course architect
LaDaris Vann, Former CFL player for the Winnipeg Blue Bombers

Other
Kimberly Bergalis, victim of first known case of clinical transmission of HIV
Louise Gopher, the first Seminole woman to earn a bachelor's degree
John Houghtaling, creator of the Magic Fingers Vibrating Bed
CeeCee Lyles, Flight attendant on United Airlines Flight 93

References

External links

Official City of Fort Pierce website
Virtual view of the City of Fort Pierce

 
County seats in Florida
Cities in St. Lucie County, Florida
Fort P
Populated coastal places in Florida on the Atlantic Ocean
Cities in Florida